Olegar Fedoro (né Olegár Pablo Fedóro; born 6 March 1958) is a Ukrainian-born former Soviet performer who later became a Spanish and then English actor.

He enrolled in the acclaimed VGIK Film School (All-Russian State University of Cinematography) where before him studied his colleagues of the profession and friends Andrei Tarkovski, Kira Muratova and Sergei Parajanov. 

After graduating from VGIK he started with a work for Andrei Tarkovsky's Stalker (1979). He is perhaps best known for his roles:

 Fyodor Dostoyevsky in the Canadian TV series Russia (1986) based on Peter Ustinov's book
 Jesuit Priest Tebaldo in Moroccan-Spanish film The Battle of the Three Kings (1990)
 Muhammed XIII ("El Zagal" the Valiant), penultimate King of Granada and uncle to Boabdil, in Spanish TV series Requiem for Granada (1991)
 Mad storyteller in Jonathan Glazer's Karmacoma by Massive Attack (1995), where he keeps mumbling in a dazed manner: "I am... a dangerous... person"
 Adolf Hitler in Simon Brasse's Sanhedrin (2004)
 Jack the Ripper in The Notebooks of Cornelius Crow (2005)
 Tasha's father in Jan Dunn Dogme film Gypo (2005)
 Christopher Columbus in History Channel's Columbus: The Lost Voyage (2007)
 The tattooist in David Cronenberg's film Eastern Promises (2007), where he was also the Ukrainian-Russian dialect coach to Viggo Mortensen in his 2008 Oscar-nominated role.
 The father in Madonna's directorial debut Filth and Wisdom (2008)
 Andrei Ivanov in Pedro Touceda's road movie Polillas (2008)
 The Rock Boat's helmsman in Richard Curtis' comedy The Boat That Rocked (2009).
 He was the Russian dialect coach to John Malkovich in Siberian Education (2012).

Selected filmography

Awards and nominations
Ibero-American Festival of Short films ABC (FIBABC), Spain

Student Academy Awards, USA

Royal Television Society Award, UK

Philadelphia Documentary & Fiction Festival

Barcelona International Film Festival

Torino International Film Festival

External links
 Instagram
 FIBABC 2013 Award Winners in Spanish ABC
 Nominations for the FIBABC Awards 2013 in Spanish ABC
 
 Photo Gallery
 Spanish Union of actors
 Variety Interview

Video clips
 Who Stole The Cup FIFA 2018?
 11 Clips
 Choose a clip
 "Isn't you?"- Scud Hero (2010) (videoclip Scud Hero)
 "Who Stole the Cup?.. Revealed!"

1958 births
Living people
English male film actors
Ukrainian male film actors
Spanish male film actors
Soviet male film actors
Soviet expatriates in Spain
Ukrainian expatriates in Spain
English expatriates in Spain